Jahmill Flu (born 24 August 1988) is a Dutch former footballer who played as a left-back.

Football career

Professional career
A prospect of the PSV academy, Flu moved to the Utrecht youth academy in 2008. He joined RBC Roosendaal in July 2010, where he made his professional debut in the second-tier Eerste Divisie on 15 April 2011 in a 2–0 loss to Fortuna Sittard. He made three total appearances for RBC before moving to league rivals Volendam in the summer of 2011. In November 2011, Flu tore his achilles tendon in a match against Telstar, sidelining him for six months. He had also suffered both hip and meniscus injuries before in his career. He returned to practice in April 2012.

Amateurs
On 21 December 2012, it was announced that Flu would leave Volendam due to lacking playing time. He instead joined the Ajax Amateurs in the Hoofdklasse, before moving to Alphense Boys in March 2013. A year later, in 2014, Flu moved to Magreb '90 playing in the Hoofdklasse.

Flu joined DFS on 24 May 2015. He played for SV Spero in the Tweede Klasse from 2016 to 2017, but decided to retire afterwards due to recurring injuries.

References

1988 births
Living people
Dutch footballers
Footballers from Utrecht (city)
FC Volendam players
RBC Roosendaal players
Eerste Divisie players
Association football defenders
Alphense Boys players
USV Elinkwijk players
FC Utrecht players
PSV Eindhoven players
AFC Ajax (amateurs) players
Magreb '90 players
Vierde Divisie players